Shahran Market, also known as Shahran Bazaar, is located in Hyderabad, India near Charminar and Laad Bazaar.  

It is a modern market which has stores particularly selling ready to wear burqa and hijab related clothing and material. It is in general a ladies' market. It is considered one of its kind in India.

The market got its name from the adjacent Shahran Restaurant, which is famous for its Hyderabadi Haleem and other foods.

References

See also

Bazaars in Hyderabad, India
Neighbourhoods in Hyderabad, India